The Central District of Kashan County is a district (bakhsh) in Kashan County, Isfahan Province, Iran. At the 2006 census, its population was 266,921, in 72,469 families.  The District has two cities: Kashan and Meshkat. The District has three rural districts (dehestan): Khorram Dasht Rural District, Kuhpayeh Rural District, and Miyandasht Rural District.

References 

Kashan County
Districts of Isfahan Province